John Williams (July 7, 1740 – December 1, 1804) was an American leader from Caswell County, North Carolina during the American Revolution.

Born in Hanover County, Virginia, he served in the North Carolina House of Commons (1778–1780) and state Senate (1782, 1793–1794).

North Carolina state senators
Members of the North Carolina House of Representatives
1740 births
1804 deaths